Singleshot Mountain is located in the Lewis Range, Glacier National Park in the U.S. state of Montana. The mountain is easily seen from Saint Mary, Montana and was named after the single-shot fired from a rifle by George Bird Grinnell when dispatching a Bighorn sheep while hunting for food in 1885 during park explorations. The sedimentary layers of the Appekunny Formation are clearly displayed on the southeastern cliffs of Singleshot Mountain.

See also
 Mountains and mountain ranges of Glacier National Park (U.S.)

References

Mountains of Glacier County, Montana
Mountains of Glacier National Park (U.S.)
Lewis Range